The Florida Sheriffs Association (FSA) is a non-profit professional association of Florida’s 66 elected Sheriffs, along with approximately 3,500 business leaders and 70,000 citizens throughout the state. The FSA’s mission is to enhance law enforcement through educational and charitable purposes within the state of Florida.

History
In 1893, Duval County Sheriff Napoleon B. Broward, who later served as governor of Florida, helped organize the Florida Sheriffs’ Mutual Benefit. In 1910, The Florida Sheriffs' Mutual Benefit Association changed names to become the Florida Sheriffs Association. The FSA served citizens of Florida by enhancing and supporting the needs of Florida’s law-enforcement community. 
Since then, FSA’s development of law enforcement, educational and charitable activities within the state helped transform it into one of the largest state law enforcement agencies in the nation.

Services
FSA provides services such as training, special task forces and legislative and legal services to help improve Florida Sheriffs' Offices and the law-enforcement community. These include:
Fostering effective law enforcement within the state.
Offering training, educational seminars and professional networking opportunities for law-enforcement officers.
Working in partnership with state and local government to develop and implement public policies.
Providing discount purchasing programs for state and local government agencies and affordable insurance programs for Sheriffs' Offices.
Promoting public support of the Florida Sheriffs Youth Ranches, the Florida Sheriff's Explorer youth program and Teen Driver Challenge.
Informing the public of new developments and trends in law enforcement, crime prevention and public safety.

Leadership
FSA is managed by a 17-member elected board of directors, all of whom are Sheriffs. The board consists of 12 directors and five officers. To insure statewide representation, active member Sheriffs in each of four divided districts nominate three directors from each district to comprise the 12-member board. The five officers are nominated from any of the four districts.
The FSA’s current appointed executive director is Steve Casey.

Key Programs

Florida Sheriffs Youth Ranches
In 1957, the FSA founded the Florida Sheriffs Boys Ranch, built to prevent delinquency and help Florida's youth to become lawful, resilient and productive citizens.
Although the project struggled to stay afloat in its first years of operation, it eventually became the Florida Sheriffs Youth Ranches (FSYR) and has expanded to over six different locations throughout the state. The FSYR has provided over 100,000 boys and girls with residential care, camp services and family services.

FSA Teen Driver Challenge
In 2006, the FSA developed the Teen Driver Challenge, a road traffic safety program to combat the high crash and fatality rate of teen drivers on Florida highways and state roads. The program is designed around both in-classroom activities and hands-on instructional driving by certified and highly trained law-enforcement officers.
The course is currently offered in 35 of the 67 counties in Florida.

Florida Deputy Sheriffs Association
In 2008, the Florida Sheriffs Association launched the Florida Deputy Sheriffs Association, a professional membership association for law enforcement, corrections and support personnel working for Florida Sheriffs’ Offices. The association establishes a forum for knowledge, cohesiveness and authority for all state law enforcement professionals.

Other Accomplishments
FSA established the Florida Sheriff’s Bureau in 1955, forerunner to what is known today as the Florida Department of Law Enforcement.
FSA founded the Florida Law Enforcement Academy, the state's first statewide training academy, in 1963.
FSA established the Florida Sheriffs Self-Insurance Fund in 1978, which has saved taxpayers millions of dollars on liability claims and annual premiums.
FSA pioneered accreditation in the state and was co-founder of the Commission for Florida Law Enforcement Accreditation in 1995.
FSA built a Law Enforcement Memorial recognizing Florida deputies and officers killed in the line of duty. The memorial, located at the front of the FSA headquarters, is open to view during daylight hours.

External links
 Florida Sheriffs Association – official site
 Florida Sheriffs Youth Ranches – official site
 Florida Sheriffs Teen Driver Challenge – official site
 Florida Deputy Sheriffs Association – official site

Organizations based in Florida
Law enforcement in Florida